Agris Lasmans (born 2 June 1979 in Cēsis) is a Latvian wheelchair curler from Riga.

At the international level, as a member of the wheelchair curling team he competed at the 2022 Winter Paralympics (Latvians finished at ninth place) and number of World championships (best result - seventh in ). As a member of the wheelchair mixed doubles curling team he and Poļina Rožkova won gold at the 2023 World championship.

At the national wheelchair curling level, he is an eight-time Latvian wheelchair champion curler (2014, 2016, 2017, 2018, 2019, 2020, 2021, 2022).

Wheelchair curling teams

Mixed doubles

References

External links 

 Video: 

Living people
Latvian male curlers
Latvian wheelchair curlers
Latvian curling champions
Paralympic wheelchair curlers of Latvia
Wheelchair curlers at the 2022 Winter Paralympics
1979 births
People from Cēsis